Kanchipuram (Tamil: காஞ்சிபுரம்), is a temple city in the Indian state of Tamil Nadu .

Kanchipuram or Kancheepuram may also refer to:
 Kanchipuram silk sari, is a silk type.
 Kanchipuram district, is a district in Tamil Nadu.
 Kanchipuram division, is a revenue division.
 Kanchipuram taluk, is a taluk.
 Kanchipuram railway station, is a railway station.